The following is a list of destroyers of France. In naval terminology, a destroyer is a fast and maneuverable yet long-endurance warship intended to escort larger vessels in a fleet, convoy or battle group and defend them against smaller, powerful, short-range attackers. The Fantasque was the fastest destroyer class ever built.

World War I
  (1899) — 4 ships

  (1899) — 4 ships

  or Pertuisane class (1900) — 4 ships

   (1902) — 20 ships

   (1905) — 13 ships

  (1907) — 10 ships

  (1908) — 7 ships

  (1908) — 2 ships

  (1909) — 4 ships

 — sold to Peru as BAP Teniente Rodríguez before completion

  (1911) — 12 ships

  (1912) — 6 ships

  (1914) — 4 ships

  (1915) — 3 ships

 — completed to a modified design
  (1915) — 2 ships, Cancelled
M89
M90
  (1917) — 12 ships

Between the World Wars
  — 2 ships, Cancelled
Lion
Guépard

World War II
  — 6 ships
 
 
 
 
 
 
  — 6 ships
 
 
 
 
 
 
  — 6 ships
 
 
 
 
 
 
  — 6 ships
 
 
 
 
 
 
  — 6 ships
 
 
 
 
 
 
  — 2 ships
 
 
  — 12 ships
 
 
 
 
 
 
 
 
 
 
 
 
  — 14 ships
 
 
 
 
 
 
 
 
 
 
 
 
 
 
  — 8 ships

Post-war
  — all 12 units retired in the 1980s.
 
 
 
 
 
 
 
 
 
 
 
 
  — all 6 units retired in the 1970s & 1980s.
 
 
 
 
 
 
  class — 1 ship, decommissioned in 1996

See also 
Escorteur

France
Destroyers of France
Destroyer